Adolfo Scilingo (born 28 July 1946 in Bahía Blanca) is a former Argentine naval officer who is serving 30 years (the legally applied limit, although he was sentenced to 640 years) in a Spanish prison after being convicted on 19 April 2005 for crimes against humanity, including extra-judicial execution.

Charges
Scilingo was charged under Spain's universal jurisdiction laws by investigating magistrate Baltazar Garzón with genocide, 30 counts of murder, 93 of causing injury, 255 of terrorism and 286 of torture.  He denied the charges but initially refused to plead, claiming to be unwell. In 2005 doctors ruled Scilingo was fit to stand trial.

The murder charges related to 30 drugged political prisoners thrown out of government jets during Leopoldo Galtieri's military junta's Dirty War against leftist insurgents between 1976 and 1983. Scilingo had earlier attracted great notoriety for publicly confessing to journalist Horacio Verbitsky in c. 1996, to participating in the so-called death flights, the first of a series of public confessions collectively called in Argentina the 'Scilingo effect' (Feitlowitz 1999). Scilingo was serving a jail term for fraud in Argentina at the time.

Judgement

The court found Scilingo guilty of crimes against humanity and torture and sentenced him to  640 years in jail. 21 years for each for the murder of 30 victims, who were thrown from planes to their deaths, and a further five years for torture and five years illegal detention. Scilingo is unlikely to serve more than 30 years in jail as that is the maximum time a person can serve for non-terrorist offences.

The Spanish case was the first use of a new Spanish law whereby people can be prosecuted for crimes committed outside Spain. Scilingo's confession prompted Argentines residing in Spain to press charges against him. It also led to Chileans living in Spain to file charges against their former dictator, Augusto Pinochet, who was later arrested in Britain at the request of Judge Baltasar Garzón.

On 4 July 2007, the Supreme Court of Spain increased Scilingo's prison sentence to 1084 years (but effective for only 25 years) and altered the conviction to the specific penalties provided in the current criminal code for the crimes of murder and unlawful detention, but held that these crimes "constitute crimes against humanity according to international law".

References

Further reading
 Jonathan Mann, "Macabre new details emerge about Argentina's 'dirty war'", CNN, March 23, 1996.
 BBC News Online , 
 Margarite Feitlowitz, A Lexicon of Terror: Argentina and the Legacies of Torture, 1999.
 Robben, Antonius C.G.M. 2018. Argentina Betrayed: Memory, Mourning, and Accountability. Philadelphia: University of Pennsylvania Press. ISBN 978-0-812-25005-3.
 Horacio Verbitsky, The Flight. Confessions of an Argentine Dirty Warrior, 1995/2005.
 Argentine Tells of Dumping 'Dirty War' Captives Into Sea. The New York Times. March 13, 1995.

1946 births
Living people
Argentine Navy officers
Operatives of the Dirty War
Argentine people convicted of crimes against humanity
People imprisoned on charges of terrorism
Prisoners and detainees of Spain
Argentine people imprisoned abroad
Place of birth missing (living people)
People extradited from Argentina
People extradited to Spain